Family Tree is the final compilation album by American hip hop group N.W.A. It features 3 of the original 6 members of N.W.A, as well as guest performances by Westside Connection, Snoop Dogg and Xzibit.

Track listing

External links
N.W.A at AllMusic
N.W.A at Discogs
N.W.A at MusicBrainz

N.W.A albums
Gangsta rap compilation albums
2008 compilation albums
Priority Records compilation albums